Albert Geromini (10 April 1896 – 6 December 1961) was a Swiss ice hockey player who competed in the 1928 Winter Olympics.

He was a member of the Swiss ice hockey team, which won the bronze medal.

External links
Albert Geromini's profile at databaseOlympics
Albert Geromini's profile at Sports Reference.com

1896 births
1961 deaths
Ice hockey players at the 1928 Winter Olympics
Medalists at the 1928 Winter Olympics
Olympic bronze medalists for Switzerland
Olympic ice hockey players of Switzerland
Olympic medalists in ice hockey